Avahi may refer to:

 Avahi (genus), a genus of woolly lemurs, which are primates that inhabit Madagascar.
 Avahi (software), a zeroconf networking implementation.